The Agricultural Wages Board was a non-departmental government body which regulated wages for farm workers under the Agricultural Wages Act 1948, until it was abolished in the Conservative led government's "bonfire of the quangos" after the Enterprise and Regulatory Reform Act 2013.

See also
UK labour law
National Minimum Wage Act 1998

References

United Kingdom labour law
Non-departmental public bodies of the United Kingdom government